This is a list of Ukrainian football transfers summer 2022.

Ukrainian Premier League

Chornomorets Odesa

In:

Out:

Dnipro-1

 
In:

Out:

Dynamo Kyiv

In:

Out:

Inhulets Petrove

In:

 

Out:

Kolos Kovalivka

In:

Out:

Kryvbas Kryvyi Rih

In:

Out:

Lviv

In:

Out:

Metalist Kharkiv

In:

Out:

Metalist 1925 Kharkiv

In:

Out:

Mynai

In:

Out:

Oleksandriya

In:

Out:

Rukh Lviv

In:

Out:

Shakhtar Donetsk

In:

Out:

Veres Rivne

In:
 

Out:

Vorskla Poltava

In:

Out:

Zorya Luhansk

In:

Out:

Ukrainian First League

LNZ Cherkasy

In:
 

Out:

FC Chernihiv

In:
 

Out:

Dinaz Vyshhorod

In:

Out:

Hirnyk-Sport Horishni Plavni

In:

Out:

Yarud Mariupol

In:
 

Out:

Nyva Ternopil

In:

Out:

Obolon Kyiv

In:
 

Out:

Polissya Zhytomyr

In:

Out:

Prykarpattia Ivano-Frankivsk 

In:

Out:

Ukrainian Second League

SC Chaika

In:

Out:

Dnipro Cherkasy

In:

Out:

Epitsentr Dunaivtsi

In:

Out:

Karpaty Lviv

In:
 

Out:

Mukachevo

In:

Out:

Niva Buzova

In:

Out:

Rubikon Kyiv

In:
 

Out:

Viktoriya Mykolaivka

In:

Out:

Omitted teams from the Ukrainian Premier League
Due to the full-scale invasion of Russia, two teams: Desna Chernihiv and Mariupol, were omitted from the upcoming Ukrainian Premier League season, because complete destruction of their infrastructure. However, they are remaining as a members of the Ukrainian Premier League.

Desna Chernihiv

 
In:

Out:

Mariupol

In:

Out:

Omitted teams from the Ukrainian First League

FC VPK-Ahro Shevchenkivka

In:

Out:

Ahrobiznes Volochysk

In:

Out:

Alians Lypova Dolyna

In:

Out:

Kramatorsk

In:

Out:

Kremin Kremenchuk

In:

Out:

Olimpik Donetsk

In:

Out:

FC Podillya Khmelnytskyi

In:

Out:

Uzhhorod

In:

Out:

Volyn Lutsk

In:

Out:

Omitted teams from the Ukrainian Second League

Balkany Zorya

In:

Out:

Enerhiya Nova Kakhovka

In:

Out:

Karpaty Halych

In:

Out:

Livyi Bereh Kyiv

In:

Out:

Lyubomyr Stavyshche

In:

Out:

Nikopol

In:

Out:

Sumy

In:

Out:

Tavriya Simferopol

In:

Out:

Trostianets

In:

Out:

References

Ukraine
Transfers
2021-21